Jasmine Hacker-Jones (born 11 July 2000) is a Welsh international judoka. She has represented Wales at the Commonwealth Games and won a bronze medal.

Biography
Hacker-Jones started judo aged 4 and was the leading British performer at the 2017 European Youth Olympics. In 2022, she was selected for the 2022 Commonwealth Games in Birmingham, where she competed in the women's -63 kg, winning the bronze medal.

References

2000 births
Living people
Welsh female judoka
British female judoka
Judoka at the 2022 Commonwealth Games
Commonwealth Games competitors for Wales
Commonwealth Games bronze medallists for Wales
Commonwealth Games medallists in judo
Medallists at the 2022 Commonwealth Games